The 1913–14 National Challenge Cup was the inaugural edition of the national knock-out soccer competition in the United States that would eventually become the modern-day Lamar Hunt U.S. Open Cup. Brooklyn Field Club won the title. 

The competition ran alongside the 1914 American Cup, an older, similar competition organised by the American Football Association (AFA). At the time, two different organisations vied for recognition as the official national association for American soccer, the predominantly north-eastern AFA and the organisers of the Challenge Cup, the newly named United States Football Association. The organisers of the National Challenge Cup prevailed, and the 1913-14 competition is thus recognised as that years national cup tournament, and the inaugural edition of what is now the U.S. Open Cup.

The second round drawing took place on November 9, 1913.

Bracket
Home teams listed on top of bracket

(*) replay after tied match
w/o walkover/forfeit victory awarded

Final

 W. Haughie
 H. Hinds or Hynds
 Charles Drinkwater
 H. W. Matthews
 Neil Clark
 Nichols
 James Ford
 George Knowles
 Percy Adamson (c) 
 Robert Millar
 Harry Shanholt
 Manager:  
 Frank Mather
 James Robertson
 Andrew Robertson
 Hugh Kelly
 David Flanagan
 Frank O'Hara
 Albert Lonie
 Thomas Campion
 Roddy O'Halloran (c)
 Thomas McGreevey
  Paddy Butler
 Manager:  Thomas McCamphill

See also
1914 American Cup

References
1914 National Challenge Cup
1914 National Challenge Cup results

External links
 Open Cup Finals
 US Open Cup History Part 1: 1914 to 1938 - Youtube

Nat
U.S. Open Cup
1913–14 domestic association football cups